Patrick Farenga is an American writer and educational activist. He is known as a leading advocate of the modern homeschooling movement which started in the 1970s.

Life 
Born in New York City, Farenga worked closely with homeschooling leader John Caldwell Holt on his Boston-based magazine, Growing Without Schooling (GWS). After Holt's death in 1985, he took over as publisher of GWS and president of the parent company, Holt Associates.

Farenga is a prolific writer, and has authored or contributed to many of the other educational publications by Holt Associates. He has written articles for numerous publications including Mothering, Paths of Learning, Home Education, and The Bulletin of Science, Technology, and Society. He contributed chapters to The Encyclopedia of School Administration (1988) and A Parent's Guide To Homeschooling (2002). Among his works, Farenga is perhaps best known as the author of The Beginner's Guide To Homeschooling (1998) and Teach Your Own: The John Holt Book of Homeschooling (2003). In addition to his homeschooling career, Farenga is also an accomplished pianist and saxophonist.
 
Though GWS ceased print publication in November, 2001, and his own three children have grown to maturity, Farenga continues to write and edit educational material, and remains an active homeschooling advocate and consultant.

Farenga has three children which he unschooled.

External links 
Personal website
A Listing of Information on Farenga and His Engagements Holt Associates/GWS
Learning In Our Own Way Learning In Our Own Way: About Pat Farenga
An Article on Unschooling By Pat Farenga
A Preface for Articles in the Journal of Alternative Education By Pat Farenga
GWS YouTube channel

American educational theorists
American education writers
Homeschooling advocates
Living people
Writers from New York City
Year of birth missing (living people)